The Music Victoria Awards of 2020 are the 15th Annual Music Victoria Awards and consist of a series of awards, presented on 8 December 2020. For the first time, an Outstanding Woman in Music Award and Best Producer Award will be awarded.

Hall of Fame inductees
 Mary Mihelakos and Chris Wilson

Mary Mihelakos has worked the across the entire spectrum of the industry – running her own PR company, booking a wide range of venues, music editor of Beat, the Sticky Carpet columnist for The Age and running the Music Victoria Awards for a number of years. Mihelakos mortgaged her home to co-deliver the first Aussie BBQ showcases at SXSW – an initiative now adopted for industry events around the world to spotlight Australian acts.

Chris Wilson is a blues singer, harmonica player, guitarist and saxophonist. After his beginnings in Sole Twister, Harem Scarem and Paul Kelly and The Coloured Girls, Chris Wilson went on to front his own bands as Crown of Thorns and released a series of acclaimed albums. Wilson died on 16 January 2019, aged 63, after a battle with pancreatic cancer.

Award nominees and winners

General awards
Voted on by the public.
Winners indicated in boldface, with other nominees in plain.

Genre Specific Awards
Voted by a select industry panel

Other Awards
Voted by a select industry panel

References

External links
 

2020 in Australian music
2020 music awards
Music Victoria Awards